Luigi Fantappiè (15 September 1901 – 28 July 1956) was an Italian mathematician, known for work in mathematical analysis and for creating the theory of analytic functionals: he was a student and follower of Vito Volterra. Later in life, he proposed scientific theories of sweeping scope.

He was born in Viterbo, and studied at the University of Pisa, graduating in mathematics in 1922. After time spent abroad, he was offered a chair by the University of Florence in 1926, and a year later by the University of Palermo. He spent the years 1934 to 1939 in the University of São Paulo, Brazil collaborating with Benedito Castrucci notorious Italian-Brazilian mathematician. In 1939 he was offered a chair at the University of Rome.

In 1941 he discovered that negative entropy has qualities that are associated with life: The cause of processes driven by negative energy lies in the future, exactly such as living beings work for a better day tomorrow. A process that is driven by negative entropy will increase order with time, such as all forms of life tend to do. This was a very controversial view at the time and not at all accepted by his colleagues. His findings indicate that negative entropy is associated with life in the same way as consciousness is. Consciousness could be a process based on negative entropy. In 1942 he put forth a unified theory of physics and biology, and the syntropy concept. In 1952 he started to work on a unified physical theory called projective relativity, for which, he asserted, special relativity was a limiting case. Giuseppe Arcidiacono worked with him on this theory.

See also
Analytic functional
Andreotti–Norguet formula
de Sitter invariant special relativity
Negentropy

Books
 Principi di una teoria unitaria del mondo fisico e biologico, Di Renzo Editore, Roma
 Conferenze scelte, Di Renzo Editore

Notes

References

.
. This is a monographic fascicle published on the "Bollettino della Unione Matematica Italiana", describing the history of the "Istituto Nazionale di Alta Matematica Francesco Severi" from its foundation in 1939 to 2003: it was written by Gino Roghi and includes a presentation by Salvatore Coen and a preface by Corrado De Concini. It is almost exclusively based on sources from the institute archives: the wealth and variety of materials included, jointly with its appendices and indexes, make this monograph a useful reference not only for the history of the institute itself, but also for the history of many mathematicians who taught or followed the institute courses or simply worked there.

External links
  Fantappiè.it
  Blog in ricordo di Luigi Fantappié
  Sintropia
 
 

1901 births
1956 deaths
University of Pisa alumni
Functional analysts
20th-century Italian mathematicians
Academic staff of the University of Palermo